The Naghlu Dam is a gravity dam on the Kabul River in Surobi District of Kabul Province in Afghanistan. The primary purpose of the dam is hydroelectricity production. The dam supports a power station with a design capacity of 100 MW of electricity. It is connected to the national grid of Afghanistan, and is currently the largest power plant in the country. It provides electricity to about 100,000 households in the Kabul region.

The dam and its reservoir are managed by the Afghan Ministry of Energy and Water. Its power station is operated by Da Afghanistan Breshna Sherkat.

Construction of Naghlu Dam was financed and supervised by the Soviet Union between January 1960 and 1968. The first generator was commissioned earlier in 1967. After the 1992 collapse of the Soviet-backed Democratic Republic of Afghanistan, the power station was used by supporters of Gulbuddin Hekmatyar as a tool to deprive Kabul of electricity. The power station fell into disrepair during the late 1990s, which provided very little electricity. After the 2001 U.S.-led invasion only two generators were operational. 

In August 2006, the Afghan Ministry of Energy and Water awarded the Russian company Technopromexport a $32.5 million contract to rehabilitate the two inoperable generators and replace the transformers. The first of the two became operational in September 2010 and the transformers were replaced by early 2012. The rehabilitation was funded by the World Bank. The second unit became operational by April 2018. In January 2016, the World Bank granted Afghanistan $83 million dollars in aid to completely rebuild the Naghlu Dam. As of April 2019, all four generators of the Naghlu power station are operating.

See also

List of dams and reservoirs in Afghanistan
Energy in Afghanistan
Renewable energy in Afghanistan

References

External links

 , May 15, 2018, World Bank.

Dams in Afghanistan
Dams on the Kabul River
Buildings and structures in Kabul Province
Hydroelectric power stations in Afghanistan
Dams completed in 1968
1968 establishments in Afghanistan
Afghanistan–Soviet Union relations
Soviet foreign aid